Emmanuel Eboué (born 4 June 1983) is an Ivorian former professional footballer who played as a right back.

Formed at ASEC Mimosas, he moved to Europe to play for Belgium's Beveren in 2002. He spent most of his career, from 2005 to 2011, with Arsenal of the Premier League, playing 214 games, including the 2006 UEFA Champions League Final. Later he moved to Galatasaray, where he played regularly and won five domestic honours in Turkey. Eboué made his international debut for the Ivory Coast in 2004, eventually earning 79 caps by 2013. He was part of their squads at five Africa Cup of Nations tournaments and two World Cups.

Club career

Early career
Born in Abidjan, Eboué began his football career in the ASEC Mimosas youth academy. In 2002, Eboué moved to ASEC's Belgian parent club KSK Beveren and spent three seasons there. His impressive performances in Belgium caught the eye of Arsenal's scouts.

Arsenal

2004–05 season
Eboué's debut came only days after signing from Beveren, in the FA Cup against Stoke City. Although he was not initially a first team regular, making just one FA Premier League appearance, as a substitute, in 2004–05, Eboué was regularly in Arsenal's reserve team. He did however contribute three appearances to Arsenal's victorious 2004–05 FA Cup campaign.

2005–06 season
In 2005–06, Eboué made his breakthrough into the Arsenal side. He started the season mainly as a reserve player, though he scored his first goal for Arsenal in the club's 3–0 League Cup third round victory at Sunderland on 25 October 2005. Despite leaving for the African Cup of Nations in January 2006, he was immediately sent into action on his return; he made his first career Premiership start at right back against Liverpool at Anfield, replacing the injured Lauren. With Lauren injured for the rest of the season, Eboué unexpectedly held his place for the remainder of Arsenal's 2005–06 campaign.

Eboué's run in the Arsenal side included matches in the UEFA Champions League knockout phase against Real Madrid, Juventus, and Villarreal. Impressed with the way the Ivorian adapted to the increased pace of the Premiership and pressure of the Champions League, Arsenal manager Arsène Wenger even compared Eboué to the legendary Brazilian winger Garrincha after an energetic performance in the 1 April 2006 game against Aston Villa. Eboué continued in the starting line-up for Arsenal in the 2006 UEFA Champions League Final at the Stade de France.

2006–07 season
Eboué started the 2006–07 season, and was named the Arsenal Player of the Month for September. However, he was injured in an international and spent the whole of the month of October out with injury. He made his first team return as a substitute in the 1–0 defeat by West Ham United on 5 November, and started the League Cup win over Everton later that same week. He scored his second Arsenal goal in their 3–1 Champions League victory over Hamburg on 21 November 2006. Persistent ankle problems have plagued him throughout December 2006 and January 2007. He attempted to make many comebacks, mostly against high-profile teams such as Liverpool, in the FA Cup third Round and Manchester United, but he was unable to come through them unscathed. Wenger decided to wait until there was no chance that there would be a recurrence of the injury. He came off the bench for Armand Traoré in the League Cup final against Chelsea. He started the match against Blackburn Rovers in the FA cup 5th Round Replay, only for his ankle to get injured again from a studs-up challenge from Blackburn winger Morten Gamst Pedersen, which the referee also missed. In May 2007, Eboué signed a new long-term contract with Arsenal.

2007–08 season

From the start of the 2007–08 season, Arsène Wenger stated his intention to move Eboué into a role on the right wing, following the signing of Bacary Sagna. On 20 September 2008, Eboué scored his first Premier League goal against Bolton Wanderers in an away match, which Arsenal won 3–1.

2008–09 season
During the 2008–09 season, he was frequently criticised by Arsenal fans after some less-than-satisfactory performances. In December 2008 against Wigan Athletic at the Emirates, Eboué played particularly poorly after being brought on as a substitute. He made many unforced errors to the point where a small section of Arsenal fans began to boo him. Eboué continued to lose possession and in the second half, Eboué tackled his own player and gifted possession to Wigan. He was subsequently substituted. This dramatic dip in form also coincided with other problems in the team, notably the absence of teammate Theo Walcott (who also played regularly on the right wing) through injury. Further appearances were confined to playing as a wing-forward or right back. On 8 March 2009, he scored the third goal against Burnley in the FA Cup fifth round match. On 14 March, he scored two goals (one a penalty) in the Gunners' 4–0 hammering of Blackburn Rovers.

2009–10 season
He scored his first goal of the 2009–10 season for Arsenal against Wigan Athletic at the Emirates Stadium, on 19 September 2009, the fixture in which he was booed by a small section of his own fans in the previous season. On 9 March 2010, in the second leg of Arsenal's Champions League tie at home to Porto, Eboué scored the fourth goal in a 5–0 win having come on as a substitute. In March 2010, Eboué dismissed speculation he would leave Arsenal and pledged to see out the remainder of his contract.

2010–11 season
At the end of 2010, late October or November, Eboué signed another long-term contract with Arsenal.

In April 2011, Eboué scored for Arsenal in their 3–1 win over Blackpool at Bloomfield Road, with a powerful strike from his weaker left foot, which helped keep Arsenal's title hopes alive. In the following match against Liverpool at the Emirates Stadium, however, he conceded a last-minute penalty by pushing Lucas Leiva in the back which denied the club victory and left them six points adrift of the leaders. On 8 May 2011, he was an unused substitute in the game against Stoke City at the Britannia Stadium in a 3–1 defeat.

At the end of the 2010–11 season, Eboué made 27 appearances in total and scored once in all competitions.

Galatasaray

2011–12 season

At the start of the 2011–12 season, Eboué lost his squad number to new signing Gervinho, who was given the number 27 shirt upon his arrival, which left Eboué's future at the club unclear. On 16 August 2011, Eboué completed a move to Turkish club Galatasaray for €3.5 million in 4-year contract (worth €2.35M a season plus bonus). Following his move to Galatasaray, Eboué revealed that manager Arsène Wenger told him he would have few first-team opportunities and to listen to interest to join the Turkish side. On 11 September 2011, Eboué made his debut in the clubs shirt in a 2–0 loss against İstanbul Büyükşehir Belediyesi.

In the match between Galatasaray and Beşiktaş which was 0–0, Eboué was pelted with missiles from the crowd whenever he neared the touchline. On 3 December 2011, Eboué scored his first goal against Gençlerbirliği, which was the only goal in a 1–0 win. He played 31 matches in the league as he secured his first league title of his professional career.

2012–13 season
In Eboué's second season at the club, the Ivorian helped the team claim victory in the Turkish Super Cup on 12 August 2012, playing the whole game in an entertaining 3–2 victory over rivals Fenerbahçe at the Kazım Karabekir Stadium in Erzurum. Eboué was part of the squad that surprisingly fell 2–1 to Turkish Second Division side 1461 Trabzon in December 2012.

During the 2013 winter transfer window, he was joined by national teammate Didier Drogba on 28 January 2013. On 9 April 2013, in the Champions League quarter-final second leg against La Liga club Real Madrid, Eboué scored from long range as Galatarsay secured a 3–2 win, falling 5–3 on aggregate. Eboué helped Galatasaray defend their league title, playing the full ninety minutes in their 4–2 defeat of Sivasspor on 5 May, a win which secured the club's 19th Turkish Super Lig title. In Gala's following match on 12 May, the Kıtalar Arası Derbi against Fenerbahçe, Galatasaray lost the match 2–1 but Eboué and Drogba were subject to racist abuse from Fenerbahçe fans during the game and no punishment was handed down on the club or its supporters.

2014–15 season
Eboue was left out of the main squad by Cesare Prandelli at the beginning of 2014–15 season. As a consequence, he played with the U21 team the whole season. As Galatasaray's foreign player limit was full, he could not return to the team after Prandelli had left.  At the end of the season, his contract was not renewed and Eboué left the club.

Sunderland
On 9 March 2016, Eboué signed a short-term contract with Sunderland. On 31 March 2016, Eboué began serving a one-year ban from all football-related activity, for failing to pay a former agent. He was released by Sunderland in April 2016, having not played for the club.

Later career
In July 2017, Eboué trained with Hungarian Ferencváros, but could not agree on a contract with the club.

In October 2017, Eboué was looking to join Türk Ocağı Limasol, a team in the Turkish Republic of Northern Cyprus. The move fell through due to issues with his blood that were discovered in a medical test.

In December 2017, Eboué was offered a job coaching the under-14 team at former club Galatasaray, when their manager Fatih Terim was made aware of Eboué's financial problems.

International career
Eboué debuted for Ivory Coast in 2004 and had generally been a regular fixture in the defence operating at right-back for the Elephants, along with former teammate Kolo Touré. On 18 November 2009, Eboué scored his first goal for Ivory Coast in a 2–2 draw against Germany. He was named in Sven-Göran Eriksson's Ivory Coast squad for the 2010 FIFA World Cup.

Personal life
Eboué is a Christian. He had three children with his Belgian wife, Aurélie, whom he married before joining Arsenal. In December 2017, Eboué told the Sunday Mirror that he is poor and homeless due to his divorce and bad investments that were under his former wife's control.

In June 2019, Eboué spoke about his ongoing struggles with mental health.

Career statistics

Club
Source:
 Allocation of appearances in the various seasons before his Arsenal career is uncertain, and therefore applied to the League section for each club, as per time he spent there.

International
Source:

International goals
Source:

Honours
Arsenal
Football League Cup runners-up 2006–07, 2010–11
UEFA Champions League runner-up: 2005–06

Galatasaray
Süper Lig: 2011–12, 2012–13, 2014–15
Turkish Cup: 2013–14
Turkish Super Cup: 2012, 2013, 2015

Ivory Coast
Africa Cup of Nations runner-up: 2012, 2006

References

External links

1983 births
2006 FIFA World Cup players
2006 Africa Cup of Nations players
2008 Africa Cup of Nations players
2010 Africa Cup of Nations players
2010 FIFA World Cup players
2012 Africa Cup of Nations players
2013 Africa Cup of Nations players
Arsenal F.C. players
ASEC Mimosas players
Association football fullbacks
Association football utility players
Belgian Pro League players
Expatriate footballers in Belgium
Expatriate footballers in England
Expatriate footballers in Turkey
Galatasaray S.K. footballers
Ivorian expatriate sportspeople in Belgium
Sunderland A.F.C. players
Ivorian expatriate sportspeople in England
Ivorian expatriate sportspeople in Turkey
Ivorian footballers
Ivorian Christians
Ivory Coast international footballers
K.S.K. Beveren players
Living people
Footballers from Abidjan
Premier League players
Süper Lig players